Paula Stern (born March 31, 1945) is an American businesswoman and former chairwoman of the United States International Trade Commission. She was first named as a commissioner by President Jimmy Carter in 1978 and appointed as chair in 1984 by President Ronald Reagan, a position she served in until 1986. During her tenure, she was highly critical of U.S. trade policies under the Reagan administration.

Early life, education, and career 
Stern attended public schools in Memphis, Tennessee, and received her bachelor's degree from Goucher College in 1967. She went on to earn a master's degree from Harvard University in 1969 as well as two additional masters' and a doctorate from the Fletcher School of Law and Diplomacy at Tufts University. Her 1976 dissertation at Tufts was titled The Water's Edge: The Jackson Amendment as a Case Study of the Role Domestic Politics Plays in the Creation of American Foreign Policy. This thesis served as the basis for her first book, Water's Edge: Domestic Politics and the Making of American Foreign Policy, which focused on Congress's role in formulating U.S. foreign policy.

Stern entered government in the late 1970s as a Senate legislative aide to Gaylord Nelson. She was also a fellow for the Council on Foreign Relations from 1976 to 1977. In 1993, she served on President Bill Clinton's advisory committee on trade policy. From 1994 to 2000, she was a professor of international business at Hamline University. Stern later founded a consulting firm in Washington, D.C., the Stern Group.

Board memberships 
Stern has served on a number of corporate boards, including for CBS, Walmart, Duracell, Harcourt, Avaya, Neiman Marcus, Avon, and Hasbro. She is also a member of the Atlantic Council's board of directors. Stern is a member of the Inter-American Dialogue.

Books 
Water's Edge: Domestic Politics and the Making of American Foreign Policy (Praeger, 1979)

References

External links
 

Atlantic Council  
Goucher College alumni
People from Memphis, Tennessee
International Trade Commission personnel
Harvard University alumni
The Fletcher School at Tufts University alumni
Living people
Hamline University faculty
1945 births
Carter administration personnel
Reagan administration personnel
Members of the Inter-American Dialogue